Hans Henny Jahnn (born Hans Henny August Jahn; 17 December 1894 – 29 November 1959) was a German playwright, novelist, and organ-builder.

Personal life
Hans Henny Jahn was born in 1894 in Stellingen, one of Hamburg's suburbs, and was the son of a shipwright.

Jahn met Gottlieb Friedrich Harms "Friedel" (1893–1931), with whom he was united in a "mystical wedding" in 1913, at a secondary school (the St. Pauli Realschule) which they both attended, and they fled from Germany to Norway to avoid enlistment into the army for World War I, where they lived together between 1914 and 1918, and after the war ended they returned to Hamburg. They met Ellinor Philips in 1918. In 1919, Jahnn founded the community of Ugrino with a sculptor, Franz Buse. In 1926, Jahnn married Ellinor, and Harms married Sybille Philips, Ellinor's sister, in 1928. When Harms died in 1931 Jahn designed his gravestone. Once the Nazi period began, he fled Germany once again to Zurich and then Bornholm to escape the hostility of the Nazis towards the gay community.

Jahnn's bisexuality, well-documented in his life, appears as well throughout his literary work, although it did not receive much recognition for some time due to his eccentric lifestyle, unconventional opinions, and homosexual relationship. Hans Henny Jahnn is buried alongside Harms and Ellinor at Nienstedten Cemetery, Hamburg, Germany.

Writing 
As a playwright, he wrote: Pastor Ephraim Magnus (1919), which The Cambridge Guide to Theatre describes as a nihilistic, Expressionist play "stuffed with perversities and sado-masochistic motifs"; Coronation of Richard III (1921; "equally lurid"); and a version of Medea (1926). Later works include the novel Perrudja, an unfinished trilogy of novels River Without Banks (Fluss ohne Ufer), the drama Thomas Chatterton (1955; staged by Gustaf Gründgens in 1956), and the novella The Night of Lead. Erwin Piscator staged Jahnn's The Dusty Rainbow (Der staubige Regenbogen) in 1961.  His work was awarded the Kleist Prize.

Jahnn was also a music publisher, focusing on 17th-century organ music. He was a contemporary of organ-builder Rudolf von Beckerath.

Selected bibliography

Prose 
 Perrudja (1929). Trans. Adam Siegel (forthcoming)
 Fluß ohne Ufer (1949–61). River Without Banks
 Das Holzschiff (1949). The Ship, trans. Catherine Hutter (1961)
 Die Niederschrift des Gustav Anias Horn (1949/50)
 Epilog (1961)
 13 nicht geheure Geschichten (1954). Thirteen Uncanny Stories, trans. Gerda Jordan (1984)
 Die Nacht aus Blei (1956). The Night of Lead, trans. Malcolm Green (1994)
Jeden ereilt es (1968). Unfinished novel, partially translated as Bath House by Adam Siegel (2015)
 The Living Are Few, the Dead Many: Selected Works of Hans Henny Jahnn (2012). Translations by Malcolm Green.

Plays 

 Pastor Ephraim Magnus (1919)
 Die Krönung Richards III (1921)
 Der Arzt / Sein Weib / Sein Sohn (1922)
 Der gestohlene Gott (1924)
 Medea (1926)
 Neuer Lübecker Totentanz (1931)
 Straßenecke (1931)
 Armut, Reichtum, Mensch und Tier (1933)
 Spur des dunklen Engels (1952)
 Thomas Chatterton (1955)

References

Sources

External links
 

1894 births
1959 deaths
Writers from Hamburg
Bisexual men
Bisexual novelists
Bisexual dramatists and playwrights
German expressionist dramatists and playwrights
Radical Democratic Party (Germany) politicians
Kleist Prize winners
German LGBT novelists
German LGBT dramatists and playwrights
German pipe organ builders
German male novelists
German male dramatists and playwrights
20th-century German novelists
20th-century German dramatists and playwrights
20th-century German male writers
20th-century German LGBT people